The 2006 Big East Conference baseball tournament was held at Bright House Field in Clearwater, FL. This was the twenty second annual Big East Conference baseball tournament. The  won their fifth tournament championship in a row and claimed the Big East Conference's automatic bid to the 2006 NCAA Division I baseball tournament.

Format and seeding 
The Big East baseball tournament was an 8 team double elimination tournament in 2006. The top eight regular season finishers were seeded one through eight based on conference winning percentage only. The field was divided into two brackets, with the winners of each bracket meeting in a single championship game. This was the first time that eight teams were included in the field.

Tournament

Jack Kaiser Award 
Wade Corpi was the winner of the 2006 Jack Kaiser Award. Carpi was a sophomore pitcher for the Notre Dame Fighting Irish.

References 

Tournament
Big East Conference Baseball Tournament
Big East Conference baseball tournament
Big East Conference baseball tournament
College baseball tournaments in Florida
Baseball competitions in Clearwater, Florida